Satyrium saepium, the hedgerow hairstreak, is a butterfly of the family Lycaenidae. It is found in western North America, from British Columbia south through California into Baja California and east through northern Arizona to northern New Mexico, Colorado and Montana.

The wingspan is 26–30 mm. The upperside is metallic copper brown. The forewings of the males have a black (although sometimes pale) oval spot along the leading edge. The underside is brown with a blue spot near the tail. Adults are on wing from April to September. They feed on the nectar of various flowers, including yerba santa and wild buckwheats.

The larvae feed on the buckbrush (Ceanothus species, Rhamnaceae). They feed on the buds and uppersides of the leaves of their host plant.

Subspecies
S. s. caliginosum Emmel, Emmel & Mattoon, 1998 (California)
S. s. chalcis (Edwards, 1869) (California)
S. s. chlorophora (Watson & Comstock, 1920) (California)
S. s. fulvescens (H. Edwards, 1877) (California)
S. s. latalinea Austin & Savage, 1998 (Utah)
S. s. obscurofuscum Austin, 1998 (Nevada)
S. s. provo (Watson & Comstock, 1920) (Utah)
S. s. rubrotenebrosum Emmel, Emmel & Mattoon, 1998 (California)
S. s. subaridum Emmel, Emmel & Mattoon, 1998 (California)
S. s. saepium (California to British Columbia)

References

Butterflies described in 1852
Satyrium (butterfly)
Lycaenidae of South America